Stellify is the first single from Ian Brown's sixth solo album My Way. It was the first time that Brown "sort of consciously sat down and decided to write a love song". The song was released on 21 September 2009. In an interview with XFM Manchester he claimed that the song was originally written for Rihanna, for her upcoming studio album, but he realised he had created "a great sound" so claimed the track for himself.  The song charted at No.31 in the UK and as of 2020, remains his last top 40 hit as a solo artist.

Track listing

Download EP
 Stellify (4:58)
 Crowning of the Poor (3:18)
 For The Glory (3:11)
 Marathon Man (3:39)

7"
 Stellify (4:58)
 Crowning of the Poor (3:18)

Promo CD
 Stellify (Single Edit) (3:32)

References

2009 songs
Ian Brown songs